The women's lead competition in sport climbing at the 2017 World Games took place on 23 July 2017 at the Nowy Targ Square in Wrocław, Poland.

Competition format
A total of 11 athletes entered the competition. In qualification every athlete has 1 chance to get to the higher point of the course. Top 8 climbers qualify to final. In final if at least 2 climbers have the same score climber, who get the height faster is placing higher.

Results

Qualifications

Final

References 

 
2017 World Games